NBD may refer to:

Business
 National Bank of Detroit
 National Bank of Dominica
 National Bank of Dubai
 NBD Television, a UK-based international distributor of TV programming
 New business development
 Nintendo Business Development

Places 
 Na Bon District
 Nam Bak District
 Naw Bahar District
 Nguyên Bình District
 Nhà Bè District
 Nong Bok District
 Nong Bua District
 North Bougainville District
 Now Bandegan District

Other
 Negative binomial distribution
 Network block device
 Neurobiological brain disorder
 Norbornadiene, a bicyclic hydrocarbon